The Archbishopric of Ohrid is a former Eastern Orthodox Church body in 1019–1767.

Archbishopric of Ohrid or Archdiocese of Ohrid may also refer to:
 Macedonian Orthodox Church – Archdiocese of Ohrid (est. 1967), an autocephalous Eastern Orthodox church in North Macedonia
 Orthodox Ohrid Archbishopric (est. 2002), an autonomous archbishopric under the jurisdiction of the Serbian Orthodox Church
 Roman Catholic Archdiocese of Ohrid (ca. 1300–1700), a former Roman Catholic archdiocese, now a titular see

Archbishop of Ohrid may also refer to:
 Archbishop of Ohrid, title of the primate of the Archbishopric of Ohrid (1019–1767)
 Archbishop of Ohrid and Macedonia, title of the primate of the Macedonian Orthodox Church – Ohrid Archbishopric (est. 1967)
 Archbishop of Ohrid and Metropolitan of Skopje, title of the primate of the Orthodox Ohrid Archbishopric, part of the Serbian Orthodox Church (est. 2002)

See also
 Ohrid (disambiguation)
 Archbishop (disambiguation)
 Serbian Archbishopric (disambiguation)